Sơn Hải may refer to several places in Vietnam, including:

Sơn Hải, Bắc Giang, a rural commune of Lục Ngạn District.
, a rural commune of Kiên Lương District.
, a rural commune of Bảo Thắng District.
, a rural commune of Quỳnh Lưu District.
, a rural commune of Sơn Hà District.